The auxiliary ship Olterra was a 5,000 ton Italian tanker scuttled by her own crew at Algeciras in the Bay of Gibraltar on 10 June 1940, after the entry of Italy in World War II. She was recovered in 1942 by a special unit of the Decima Flottiglia MAS to be used as an undercover base for manned torpedoes in order to attack Allied shipping at Gibraltar.

Construction and early career

Olterra started life as the tanker Osage. She was built in 1913 by Palmer's Ship Building and Iron Co Ltd, Tyneside, United Kingdom, for a German company. Osage was sold to the Standard Oil Co in New York in 1914 and renamed Baton Rouge. In 1925 she was again sold, this time to the European Shipping Co. Ltd of London and renamed Olterra. As Olterra she passed through the hands of the British Oil Shipping Co. Ltd and in 1930 was bought by Andrea Zanchi in Genoa. On 10 June 1940, when Italy entered World War II by declaring war on France and the United Kingdom, Olterra found herself in the Bay of Gibraltar off Algeciras, Spain. She was scuttled by her own crew to prevent her capture by British forces from Gibraltar.

Previous operations

From 24 September 1940 to 15 September 1942, there were six submarine-borne assaults on Gibraltar. Three of them resulted in the destruction or sinking of a number of Allied freighters, with a total tonnage of some 40,000 tn. Three of them were carried out by human torpedoes launched from the submarine ; the other two were the work of combat swimmers.

Villa Carmela
After the attacks carried out by Scirè, the commander of the Decima MAS realised that, given the limitations of using a submarine as a mother ship for human torpedoes in Gibraltar, it would be more feasible to mount a secret base in neutral Spain. A first step in that direction was taken when a member of the Decima, Antonio Ramognino, rented a bungalow along the coast road near Algeciras, right in front of a bay used by Allied convoys to drop anchors. The operations from Villa Carmela were carried out by combat swimmers. Because Ramognino's wife was a Spanish citizen, he had little difficulty establishing his ‘home’ there.

Five merchant ships were sunk or damaged from July to September 1942 by frogmen from Villa Carmela using limpet mines. Olterra played the role of advanced observation post for those missions.

Refitting

At the same time, another officer of the Italian special unit, Lieutenant Licio Visintini, himself a veteran of previous submarine incursions against the "Rock", learned about Olterra and conceived the idea of a secret mother ship for the maiali. Maiale (literally "pig") is the Italian nickname for the human torpedoes. Under the pretext of raising the ship to sell it to a Spanish owner, a team of members of the Decima, disguised as Italian civilian workers, took control of the tanker. The ship was towed to Algeciras, where "repairs" were started. The Italian Navy personnel were helped by two civilian members of the crew. They had remained on board the half sunken oiler along with a Spanish guard for more than two years, in order to protect the rights of the Italian company which owned Olterra. Once at docks, some of Olterras cargo holds and a boiler room were modified by Visintini men into a workshop for the assembling and maintenance of human torpedoes. An improvised observation post was also mounted on the forecastle to watch the Bay of Gibraltar and the Allied ships at anchor there. A scene of civilian sailors working to overhaul the ship was meanwhile set up for the outsiders, in order to deceive both British and Spanish authorities. The torpedoes (in spare parts) and other equipment were smuggled into Spain by men of the Decima under the pretense of being materials for the ‘works’ on board Olterra.  Finally, a sliding hatch was opened with a cutting torch six feet below the waterline. This would be the exit door of the manned torpedoes, which would launch their attacks from the flooding bilge, right beneath the workshop. The special unit in charge of the operations was dubbed Squadriglia Ursa Major, after the constellation of the same name.

First incursion

By the end of the autumn of 1942, Olterra was ready for her mission. The workshop works were completed and all the supplies smuggled from Italy had reached Spain without raising any suspicion. Visintini planned a three manned torpedoes mission, each of them carrying two divers: the leading torpedo, driven by Visintini himself and Petty Officer Magro, the second by 2nd Lieutenant Cella and Sergeant Leone and the third by Midshipman Manisco and Petty Officer Varini. The targets were designated in the following order: for Visintini,  Nelson, for Manisco, Formidable and for Cella, Furious.

The assault craft departed from Olterra during the early hours of 8 December. At 2:15 AM, the first human torpedo reached the area of the boom defences. The motor launches and sentries inside the British base were quietly active and alert, conscious of the danger of a potential attack on the fleet at anchor. One of the security measures taken by the Royal Navy after the summer incursions of combat swimmers was the deployment at Gibraltar of an underwater bomb disposal unit, under the command of Lieutenant Lionel Crabb. A pattern of depth charges was dropped by the motor barges at an interval of three minutes. The craft of Visintini and Magro was apparently hit by one of the charges and destroyed when they were trying to find a breach in the steel net protecting the harbour. Their bodies were recovered by the British some days later and buried at sea with full honors. The second "pig" also endured the strong response of British defences after being uncovered by a searchlight. After a long chase by anti-submarine boats, the Italian crew decided to scuttle their craft and took shelter on board an American freighter. They discarded their swimsuits before submitting themselves to Gibraltar authorities. The last manned torpedo was caught in the middle of the general alarm across the stronghold, but managed to slip beneath the waters and fool the submarine chasers. The copilot, Leone, became missing during the pursuit and was never found; Cella, meanwhile, abandoned the craft elsewhere, thinking that he was still near Gibraltar or, in the best case, stranded close to the Spanish coast. With the idea of becoming a prisoner of war or being arrested and interned by Spanish authorities in mind, Cella surfaced, only to find that he was just a few meters away from Olterra. His torpedo was recovered by the Italians the following day. The two divers captured by the British told their interrogators that the attack was launched by submarine, successfully deceiving Allied intelligence. Nevertheless, the first human torpedoes mission ended in failure.

Second incursion

After the death of Visintini, Lieutenant Ernesto Notari took charge of the Ursa Major unit onboard Olterra. Replacements of personnel and materials were also sent from Italy. Owing to the improvements in the boom defenses, the next missions were planned against transport and cargo ships in the anchorage area around the naval base. The end of the war in North Africa and the subsequent Allied landings on Sicily also made the attacks on logistic ships a priority. In May 1943, Commander Borghese, of Scirè, was appointed commander of the Decima. The night of the 8th was chosen for the next assault, taking advantage of the bad weather and the phase of the moon. Lieutenant Notari, along with his second, Petty Officer Ario Lazzari, was the head of another three-torpedo wave heading for Gibraltar. The second human torpedo was manned by Lieutenant Tadini and Petty Officer Mattera, and the third by Second Lieutenant Cella and Petty Officer Montalenti. In order to divert any British suspicion from Olterra, the selected targets were merchant ships at anchor in the farthest point from Algeciras. The gale that was raging at the time hampered the mission, because the current forced them to dive around the targets before they could attach the limpet mines to the hulls. At dawn, all the Italian craft reached their mother ship safely. They had mined three vessels, the American Liberty ship Pat Harrison (7,000 tons), and the British freighters Mahsud (7,500 tons) and Camerata (4,875 tons). When the charges exploded, the American transport was heavily damaged and became a total loss. One American sailor was killed by the blast. Mahsud rested on the bay’s bottom with much of the ship still above the water line, while Camerata sank outright. To mislead the British into thinking of combat swimmers instead of manned torpedoes, members of the Italian secret service scattered diving equipment along the shore. The second attempt from  Olterra had been a stunning success.

Last mission

On 25 July, Mussolini was removed from power, a clear signal that Italy was on the brink of collapse. The course of the war and the political changes were no deterrent for the Decima MAS, which continued to plan and execute attacks on Allied shipping in all fronts. On 10 June, the unit was awarded the Medaglia d’oro as a tribute to their deeds. On the night of 3 August 1943, the Ursa Major carried out the last operation against Gibraltar. Again, three craft left the Olterra in search of their targets: three transport ships at anchor in the bay. Notari led the "pigs" close to the Spanish coast to avoid the searchlights aimed at open sea. His second man was Petty Officer Andrea Gianoli, whose training on piloted torpedoes was poor. While the crew was clamping the explosive charge to the keel of a Liberty ship, their torpedo spun out of control. Then, the craft surfaced just a few feet from their intended victim. Half conscious and with no trace of his companion, Notari tried to fix the mechanical problems developed by his torpedo, but the diving mechanism was disabled. At the end, he managed to sneak out at full speed, helped by a school of porpoises which covered his wake. Gianoli was left behind. After waiting two hours on the rudder of the ship, he shouted for help. Once Gianoli was taken on board, a motor launch carrying a member of Crabb’s diving unit was called to the scene. There was little doubt that the ship, the American Liberty Harrison Grey Otis had been mined. The warhead blew up just seconds before the British diver, Petty Officer Bell, could put his foot on the water. One sailor died and eight others were seriously injured. Like her sister ship Pat Harrison in May, the 7,700 tn Otis was declared a constructive total loss. Two other Allied ships were also rocked by explosions at the same time, about 4:00 am of 4 August. The Norwegian Thorshøvdi, of 9,900 tn was broken in two by the blast, while the British Stanridge (6,000 tons) sank in shallow water. The last mission of the Ursa Major destroyed 23,000 tn of Allied shipping.

Aftermath

Italy submitted to Allied terms on 8 September 1943. The war was over, this time for good, for Olterra. Until then, the British in Gibraltar had no proof to link the presence of the tanker at Algeciras with the raids on their ships. In Leon Goldsworthy's words:We never found any proof of the part played by the Olterra in this affair. From British Naval Headquarters on Gibraltar we could see, with the naked eye, the Olterra’s superstructure above the exterior mole at Algeciras. The possibility that the Olterra might be associated in some way with the attacks of human torpedoes did not escape us, but there was never the least visible evidence to suggest the actual nature of her participation.

The Spanish authorities tried to hide the evidence, but when Crabb’s diving team boarded Olterra after the Italian armistice, they found spare parts from three different torpedoes. This allowed them to reassemble a full manned torpedo, named Emily. The craft was lost after six trials at open seas. Crabb met some of his former enemies after the war, including the last commander of the Ursa Major, Lieutenant Notari.

Relics from the Olterra 
Though the ship was broken up and disposed of in 1961, some bits of her outer plating, bearing the ship's name and a few portholes were salvaged and put into display at the Italian Naval Museum in La Spezia, along with other Decima Flotilla MAS artifacts (a barchino assault explosive motor boat and a maiale manned torpedo).

See also
 
Decima MAS
Human torpedo
Military history of Gibraltar during World War II
Spain in World War II

Notes

External links
 Underwater attacks from the Olterra (Google Books)

Sources

Borghese, Valerio (1995). Sea Devils: Italian Navy Commandos in World War II. Naval Institute Press. .
Bragadin, Marc'Antonio (1957). The Italian Navy in World War II, United States Naval Institute, Annapolis. .
Breuer, William (2001). Daring Missions of World War II. J. Wiley. 
Cocchia, Aldo (1958). The hunters and the hunted. United States Naval Institute, Annapolis. .
 Greene, Jack & Massignani, Alessandro (2004).The Black Prince and the Sea Devils: The Story of Valerio Borghese and the Elite Units of the Decima MAS. Da Capo Press. .
Longo, Luigi Emilio (1991). "Reparti speciali" italiani nella seconda guerra mondiale: 1940-1943.  Mursia. .
O'Donnell, Patrick K. (2006). Operatives, Spies, and Saboteurs: The Unknown Story of World War II's OSS. Kensington Publishing Corporation. 
Pugh, Marshall (1956). Frogman: Commander Crabb's Story. Scribner.
Schofield, Williams, Carisella P. (2004). Frogmen: First Battles. Branden Books. .

1913 ships
Auxiliary ships of the Regia Marina
Olterra campaign
Clandestine operations
Frogman operations
Gibraltar in World War II
Italian naval victories in the battle of the Mediterranean
Maritime incidents in June 1940
MAS fleet
Ships built on the River Tyne
Ships of Italy
Shipwrecks of Spain
Spain in World War II
Tankers of Italy
World War II merchant ships of Italy
World War II naval ships of Italy
World War II raids
World War II shipwrecks in the Mediterranean Sea